Chris Ziogas is an American Democratic Party politician currently serving as a member of the Connecticut House of Representatives from the 79th district, which includes part of Bristol, since 2017. Ziogas was first elected to the seat in 2016, defeating Republican challenger Peter Del Mastro by an 8-point margin. In 2018 and 2020, Ziogas defeated runs by Republican David Rackliffe, winning with 54 and 53% of the vote respectively. Ziogas currently serves on the House Higher Education and Employment Advancement Committee, Baking Committee, and the Finance, Revenue, and Bonding Committee.

References

Living people
Democratic Party members of the Connecticut House of Representatives
People from Bristol, Connecticut
Year of birth missing (living people)